Robert Stein (1938/9 – 13 August 2021) was a Scottish professional footballer who played for Broxburn Athletic, Raith Rovers, Montrose and East Stirlingshire as a right back.

His brother Colin was also a footballer.

References

1930s births
2021 deaths
Scottish footballers
Association football fullbacks
Scottish Football League players
Broxburn Athletic F.C. players
Raith Rovers F.C. players
Montrose F.C. players
East Stirlingshire F.C. players